Simen Spieler Nilsen (born 4 August 1993) is a Norwegian speed skater.

Career
He placed 15th in the 2013 World Allround Championships in Vikingskipet, Hamar. In the 2013 World Single Distance Championships in Adler Arena, Sochi, he placed 5th in the men's team pursuit.

Nilsen placed 25th in the men's 5000 metres in the 2014 Winter Olympics in Sochi.

Records

Personal records

Nilsen occupies the 28th position on the adelskalender with a score of 147.882 points

References

External links 
 
 
 

1993 births
Norwegian male speed skaters
Speed skaters at the 2014 Winter Olympics
Speed skaters at the 2018 Winter Olympics
Olympic speed skaters of Norway
People from Arendal
Living people
Medalists at the 2018 Winter Olympics
Olympic medalists in speed skating
Olympic gold medalists for Norway
World Single Distances Speed Skating Championships medalists
Sportspeople from Agder